Bisdehydrodoisynolic acid (BDDA), as the (Z)-isomer ((Z)-BDDA), is a synthetic, nonsteroidal estrogen related to doisynolic acid that was never marketed. It is one of the most potent estrogens known, although it has more recently been characterized as a selective estrogen receptor modulator (SERM). BDDA and other doisynolic acid derivatives display relatively low affinity accompanied by disproportionately high estrogenic potency in vivo, which was eventually determined to be due to transformation into metabolites with greater estrogenic activity. The drug was discovered in 1947 as a degradation product of the reaction of equilenin or dihydroequilenin with potassium hydroxide. It is the seco-analogue of equilenin, while doisynolic acid is the seco-analogue of estrone. These compounds, along with diethylstilbestrol, can be considered to be open-ring analogues of estradiol. The methyl ether of BDDA, doisynoestrol, is also an estrogen, and in contrast to BDDA, has been marketed.

See also 
 Allenolic acid
 Carbestrol
 Fenestrel
 Methallenestril
 Stilbestrol
 Triphenylethylene

References 

Carboxylic acids
Phenanthrenes
Synthetic estrogens